Grand Encounter (subtitled 2° East / 3° West) is an album by pianist and composer John Lewis with saxophonist Bill Perkins, guitarist Jim Hall, bassist Percy Heath and drummer Chico Hamilton recorded for the Pacific Jazz label in 1956. The subtitle refers to the groups mix of East Coast (Lewis, Hall and Heath) and West Coast (Perkins and Hamiton) musicians.

Reception

The Allmusic review by Scott Yanow stated: "this classic session is the ultimate in cool jazz".

Track listing
 "Love Me or Leave Me" (Walter Donaldson, Gus Kahn) - 8:18
 "I Can't Get Started" (Vernon Duke, Ira Gershwin) - 3:31
 "Easy Living" (Ralph Rainger, Leo Robin) - 4:13
 "Two Degrees East - Three Degrees West" (John Lewis) - 6:07
 "Skylark" (Hoagy Carmichael, Johnny Mercer) - 3:06
 "Almost Like Being in Love" (Frederick Loewe, Alan Jay Lerner) - 9:26

Personnel 
John Lewis - piano
Bill Perkins - tenor saxophone
Jim Hall - guitar
Percy Heath - bass 
Chico Hamilton - drums

References 

1957 albums
John Lewis (pianist) albums
Pacific Jazz Records albums